St. Elizabeth High School is a coeducational Catholic high school in Wilmington, Delaware.  It is part of the Roman Catholic Diocese of Wilmington.  It was founded in 1940 by James M. Grant. Originally, the school was staffed by sisters of the Benedictine order. St. Elizabeth High School shares many facilities with the St. Elizabeth Elementary School and receives a good share of its high school enrollment from the elementary school graduates. The school colors are maroon and gold.

Notes and references

External links
 
 

Catholic secondary schools in Delaware
High schools in New Castle County, Delaware
Educational institutions established in 1940
Roman Catholic Diocese of Wilmington
1940 establishments in Delaware
Schools in Wilmington, Delaware